Ahmed Aboelela Moursi Khalaf (born 24 February 1999), commonly known as Bebo, is an Egyptian basketball player who plays for Al Ittihad Alexandria of the Egyptian Basketball Super League. He also plays for the Egypt national basketball team, with whom he appeared at the AfroBasket 2021 tournament.

Early career
Khalaf played at the Basketball Without Borders camp in 2016.

Professional career
After playing in the youth divisions of Gezira, Khalaf was signed by Spanish top-flight club Bàsquet Manresa at age 16. Manresa's sports manager Pere Romero had watched him play at the 2015 FIBA Under-19 World Championship. On May 14, 2017, he made his professional debut in the Liga ACB against in a loss against Tenerife, scoring 2 points in seven minutes.

The following 2017–18 season, Khalaf played on loan for Martorell in the third division LEB Plata.

In 2018, Khalaf returned to his native Egypt to play for Al Ittihad Alexandria.

National team career
Khalaf played for Egypt's under-16, under-17 and under-19 team and played in African Championship and World Championship in these age ranges. 

He played with the senior team at the AfroBasket 2021 with his country, appearing in two group phase games.

References

External links
Ahmed Khalaf at Proballers
Ahmed Khalaf at RealGM

1999 births
Al Ittihad Alexandria Club basketball players
Bàsquet Manresa players
Egyptian men's basketball players
Alexandria Sporting Club players
Centers (basketball)
Living people